Julián Cuesta Díaz (born 28 March 1991), known simply as Julián, is a Spanish professional footballer who plays for Super League Greece club Aris Thessaloniki F.C. as a goalkeeper.

Club career

Sevilla
Julián was born in Campotéjar, Province of Granada, Andalusia. He played youth football with Sevilla FC, spending several of his first seasons as a senior with the reserves in Segunda División B.

On 26 January 2013, as both players who split first-choice status in the first team, Diego López and Andrés Palop, were unavailable (the former had been sold to Real Madrid shortly before, the latter was injured), Julián was promoted to the main squad. He made his La Liga debut two days later, keeping a clean sheet in a 3–0 home win against Granada CF.

Almería
On 21 January 2014, Julián was loaned to fellow league side UD Almería until the end of the campaign. He signed on a permanent basis on 13 June, after agreeing to a three-year deal.

Julián made his debut for the Rojiblancos on 5 December 2014, starting in a 4–3 away win over Real Betis in the round of 32 of the Copa del Rey. After starter Rubén went down with an injury he became the starter, notably saving a penalty kick in a 1–0 victory at RC Celta de Vigo.

Wisła Kraków
On 22 June 2017, Julián signed a one-year contract with Polish club Wisła Kraków. His maiden appearance in the Ekstraklasa occurred on 14 July, in a 2–1 away defeat of Pogoń Szczecin.

Aris
On 11 July 2018, Aris Thessaloniki F.C. announced the signing of Julián on a two-year deal. On 6 March 2019, as a reward for his solid performances, he extended his link until the summer of 2021.

Career statistics

References

External links

1991 births
Living people
Sportspeople from the Province of Granada
Spanish footballers
Footballers from Andalusia
Association football goalkeepers
La Liga players
Segunda División players
Segunda División B players
Sevilla Atlético players
Sevilla FC players
UD Almería players
Ekstraklasa players
Wisła Kraków players
Super League Greece players
Aris Thessaloniki F.C. players
Spanish expatriate footballers
Expatriate footballers in Poland
Expatriate footballers in Greece
Spanish expatriate sportspeople in Poland
Spanish expatriate sportspeople in Greece